Grebner is a surname. Notable people with the surname include:

  (born 1954), Soviet screenwriter
 Mark Grebner (born 1952), American politician, attorney, and political consultant
 Paul Grebner (fl. 1560–1590), German schoolteacher and author